State Route 17 (abbreviated SR 17) is part of Maine's system of numbered state highways, located in the south central part of the state.

SR 17 travels through parts of Franklin, Oxford, Androscoggin, Kennebec, Lincoln and Knox counties.

Route description

SR 17 begins in Franklin County at a T-intersection with SR 4 (Carry Road) in Oquossoc village (part of Rangeley town.) 

From there it heads south along the western shore of Rangeley Lake, passing South Shore Drive on the east, and continues on through Rangeley Plantation.
It then enters Oxford County at Byron, and continues south through Roxbury and into Mexico where it intersects US 2.

It then runs westerly concurrent with US 2 through Mexico and Dixfield 16.79 miles (27.02 km) until it leaves US 2 near the border of Oxford County  and re-enters Franklin County, where it runs westerly until it connects with SR 4 in Jay.
 
It then runs southerly concurrent with SR 4 through Jay and into Androscoggin County at Livermore Falls where it switches to run concurrent with SR 133 for a short way before leaving SR 133 and heading east into Kennebec County through the town of Fayette and into the town of Readfield where it concurs with SR 41 for 2.37 miles (3.81 km.)
 
It then leaves SR 41 and continues southeasterly into Manchester where it concurs with US 202, SR 11 and SR 100 into Augusta, passing over Interstate 95 and on into Augusta center, then concurrently with several other major routes (US 201 and US 202) over the bridge at Augusta on the Kennebec River. Once over the river it then turns south leaving all other routes except concurrent with SR 9 for a short distance before turning east and continuing into Windsor where it concurs with SR 32. It then continues southeasterly into Lincoln County at Whitefield and Jefferson  where it leaves SR 32 and continues easterly through Somerville entering Knox County and intersecting first with SR 206 and then SR 220 at Washington.

Continuing easterly through Union where it concurs with SR 131 for a short distance before concurring with SR 235 for 2.78 miles (4.47 km) and then continuing on through Rockport intersecting SR 90 there. And finally on into Rockland, where it terminates at US 1 and 1A close to the waterfront port and the Atlantic Ocean.

Junction list

Concurrent routes
 U.S. Route 2: , Mexico to Wilton
 State Route 4: , Jay to Livermore Falls
 State Route 133: , Livermore Falls
 State Route 41: , Readfield
 State Route 135: , Readfield
 U.S. Route 202 / State Route 100: , Manchester to Augusta
 State Route 11: , Manchester to Augusta
 U.S. Route 201: , Augusta
 State Route 9: , Augusta
 State Route 32: , Windsor to Jefferson
 State Route 131: , Union
 State Route 235: , Union
 U.S. Route 1A: , Rockland

References

017
Transportation in Oxford County, Maine
Transportation in Franklin County, Maine
Transportation in Androscoggin County, Maine
Transportation in Kennebec County, Maine
Transportation in Knox County, Maine